Wu Kongming (born 18 July 1964) is a Chinese politician, currently serving as president of the Chinese Academy of Agricultural Sciences.

He is an alternate member of the 20th Central Committee of the Chinese Communist Party.

Biography
Wu was born in Gushi County, Henan, on 18 July 1964. He attended Henan Agricultural University where he received his bachelor's degree in plant protection in 1984. After completing his master's degree in entomology from the Postgraduate Department of Henan Academy of Agriculture and Forestry Sciences in 1987, he entered the Graduate School of Chinese Academy of Agricultural Sciences where he obtained his doctor's degree in entomology in 1994.

Wu joined the Plant Protection Institute, Henan Academy of Agricultural Sciences as an assistant researcher in July 1987, and moved to the Institute of Plant Protection, Chinese Academy of Agricultural Sciences in September 1994. He moved up the ranks to become deputy director in December 2003 and director in January 2006. He was promoted to vice president in October 2012. In October 2021, he was promoted again to become president, a position at vice-ministerial level.

Honours and awards
 2007 State Science and Technology Progress Award (Second Class)
 2010 State Science and Technology Progress Award (Second Class)
 2011 Member of the Chinese Academy of Engineering (CAE)
 2011 Science and Technology Progress Award of the Ho Leung Ho Lee Foundation

References

1964 births
Living people
People from Gushi County
Engineers from Henan
Henan Agricultural University alumni
Members of the Chinese Academy of Engineering
People's Republic of China politicians from Henan
Chinese Communist Party politicians from Henan
Alternate members of the 20th Central Committee of the Chinese Communist Party
Fellows of the African Academy of Sciences
Associate Fellows of the African Academy of Sciences